Peridiothelia is a genus of fungi in the family Pleomassariaceae. P. oleae is a little-known species found in Europe.

References

Pleosporales
Taxa named by David Leslie Hawksworth
Taxa described in 1985